The Shire of Collie is a local government area in the South West region of Western Australia, about  east of Bunbury and about  south of the state capital, Perth.

History

The Shire of Collie originated in the amalgamation of the Municipality of Collie (1901) and the Collie Road District (1900) to form the Collie Coalfields Road District on 2 March 1951. It was declared a shire and named the Shire of Collie with effect from 1 July 1961 following the passage of the Local Government Act 1960, which reformed all remaining road districts into shires.

Wards
The shire is no longer divided into wards and the eleven councillors sit at large.

Towns and localities
The towns and localities of the Shire of Collie with population and size figures based on the most recent Australian census:

Notable councillors
 John Ewing, Collie Roads Board chairman 1905; also a state MP
 Herbert Wells, mayor of Collie 1908–1909, 1911–1913; later a state MP
 Bob Pike, Collie Shire Council 1957–1970, shire president 1962–1970; later a state MP

Heritage-listed places

As of 2023, 198 places are heritage-listed in the Shire of Collie, of which eight are on the State Register of Heritage Places, among them Wellington Dam.

References

External links
 

 
Collie